The secretary of state of New York is a cabinet officer in the government of the U.S. state of New York who leads the Department of State (NYSDOS).

The current secretary of state of New York is Robert J. Rodriguez, a Democrat.

Duties
The secretary is responsible for the regulation of a number of businesses and professions, including private investigators, cosmetologists, real estate brokers, appraisers, and notaries public. The secretary also regulates cemeteries, registers corporations and business organizations, and maintains business records under the Uniform Commercial Code and other laws. The New York State Athletic Commission is vested within the department and regulates combat sports such as boxing and professional wrestling occurring within the state.

The secretary's office includes the Office of Local Government Services, which provides training assistance to local governments in areas such as fire prevention, coastal management, and code enforcement.

The secretary of state is responsible for publishing local laws on their website and as a supplement to the Laws of New York. They are also responsible for publishing on their website a complete codification of all local laws in effect that have been adopted by the legislative body of each county.

History
The office of the secretary of state of New York was established in 1778, and is one of the oldest government agencies of the state of New York.

Until 1822, the secretary of state was appointed by the Council of Appointment for an indefinite term, but could be substituted at any time, especially if the majority party in the council changed. Besides his other duties, the secretary of state was also the secretary of the Council of Appointment.

From 1823 to 1845, the secretary was elected by joint ballot of the New York State Legislature for a term of three years.

From 1847 on, the secretary and the other state cabinet officers were elected by the voters at the state elections in November in odd years to a two-year term, so that, until 1877, they served in the second half of the term of the governor in office and the first half of the term of the succeeding governor, since the governors at the time were elected to a two-year term in even years. From 1877 on, the governor served a three-year term, while the secretary continued to be elected for two years.

The secretary elected in 1895 received an additional year and served a three-year term, and from 1898 on, the secretary and other state officers were elected in even years to a two-year term at the same time as the governor, and they served concurrently.

In 1926, during the governorship of Al Smith, the state administration was reorganized, and the office became appointive and has remained so. The last secretary elected was Florence E. S. Knapp; the first appointed by the governor was Robert Moses.

On March 31, 2011, Part A of Chapter 62 of the Laws of 2011 merged the former New York State Consumer Protection Board into the Department of State creating a new Division of Consumer Protection.

List of secretaries of state

See also
 List of company registers#United States

Notes

Sources
Google Books The Civil List of New York

External links
 Official website of the New York Department of State
 Department of State in the New York Codes, Rules and Regulations

 
1778 establishments in New York (state)